General elections were held in Dominica on 26 October 1970. Prior to the elections, the ruling Dominica Labour Party split, with a faction led by Prime Minister Edward Oliver LeBlanc contesting the elections as the 'LeBlanc Labour Party' and the other faction contesting under the DLP name and led by N.A.N. Ducreay. The LeBlanc faction won 8 of the 11 seats. Voter turnout was 81.6%.

Results

References

Dominica
Elections in Dominica
1970 in Dominica
Dominica
October 1970 events in North America